Ant Hill is a hill on Antarctica,  high, rising steeply on the west side of the Skelton Glacier between Ant Hill Glacier and Dilemma Glacier. It was surveyed and named in 1957 by the New Zealand party of the Commonwealth Trans-Antarctic Expedition, 1956–58. Ant Hill was named by geological members because of the prominent anticline in the bluff below the hill.

References
 

Hills of the Ross Dependency
Hillary Coast